Edward Stanley Graham Stuart (1894 - 1985), was a South African international lawn bowler.

Bowls career
He won a silver medal in the fours at the 1958 British Empire and Commonwealth Games in Cardiff, with Norman Snowy Walker, Wilfred Randall and Edward Williams.

He won the 1957 rinks at the National Championships, bowling for the Observatory Bowls Club.

Personal life
He was born in Scotland and was an electrician and engineer by trade.

References

1894 births
1985 deaths
Bowls players at the 1958 British Empire and Commonwealth Games
South African male bowls players
Scottish emigrants to South Africa
Scottish male bowls players
Commonwealth Games silver medallists for South Africa
Commonwealth Games medallists in lawn bowls
Medallists at the 1958 British Empire and Commonwealth Games